Nasutitermes  is a species of snouted termite occurring in Australia. It is common in Canberra and parts of New South Wales. It nests in soil. Spores of Metarhizium robertsii have been found in their mounds.

References

Insects of Australia
Nasutitermes
Insects described in 1925